Trigger Happy may refer to:

 Trigger Happy (book), by Steven Poole
 Trigger Happy!, 1956 jazz album by Herman "Trigger" Alpert  
 "Trigger Happy Jack (Drive By a Go-Go)", single by Poe. 
 Triggerhappy (Transformers), a fictional character from the Transformers franchise
 Trigger Happy TV, British television show
 "Trigger Happy" (Weird Al Yankovic song)
 Trigger Happy (Skylanders), a game character from Skylanders: Spyro's Adventure
 Trigger Happy (1961 film)
 Trigger Happy (1996 film)
 Danganronpa: Trigger Happy Havoc, first game in the Danganronpa series.

See also